Chakora may refer to:

 Chakora, Pakistan, village in Punjab, Pakistan
 Chakora (mythology), mythological bird